The 1989 Jeep-Eagle Aloha Bowl was a college football bowl game, played as part of the 1989-90 bowl game schedule of the 1989 NCAA Division I-A football season. It was the eighth Aloha Bowl.  It was played on December 25, 1989, at Aloha Stadium in Honolulu, Hawaii. The game matched the Hawaii Rainbows against the Michigan State Spartans, and was televised on ABC. The game marked the first ever bowl appearance for Hawaii. Michigan State won the 1989 contest 33–13.

The game was notable for the offensive struggles of the Rainbow Warriors in committing seven fumbles and four interceptions. Blake Ezor would star for the Spartans in being selected as the game's MVP with 41 carries for 179 yards and three touchdowns.

Scoring summary

First quarter
MSU – Blake Ezor 3-yard run (John Langeloh kick blocked) (3:59). 6-0 MSU

Second quarter
MSU – Blake Ezor 2-yard run (John Langeloh kick) (14:53). 13-0 MSU
MSU – John Langeloh 30-yard FG. (7:12). 16-0 MSU
MSU – John Langeloh 34-yard FG. (1:02). 19-0 MSU

Third quarter
HAW – Chris Roscoe 11-yard pass from Garrett Gabriel (Jason Elam kick blocked). (9:45). 19-6 MSU
MSU – Hyland Hickson 1-yard run (John Langeloh kick). 26-6 MSU

Fourth quarter
HAW – Dane McArthur 23-yard pass from Garrett Gabriel (Jason Elam kick). (8:07). 26-13 MSU
MSU – Blake Ezor 26-yard run (John Langeloh kick) (5:36). 31-13 MSU

Statistics

References

Aloha Bowl
Aloha Bowl
Hawaii Rainbow Warriors football bowl games
Michigan State Spartans football bowl games
December 1989 sports events in the United States
Aloha Bowl